Khotin is an urban-type settlement in Sumy Raion of Sumy Oblast in Ukraine. It is located on the banks of the Oleshnia, a right tributary of the Psel in the drainage basin of the Dnieper. Khotin hosts the administration of Khotin settlement hromada, one of the hromadas of Ukraine. Population:

Economy

Transportation
The settlement has access to Highway H07 which runs south to Sumy, Romny, and Kyiv. The same highway runs north to the Russian border and across the border to Sudzha and Kursk.

References

Urban-type settlements in Sumy Raion